The Darfur Wall is a non-profit web site that raises awareness of the Darfur conflict and supports Darfur-relief organizations.  It displays a list of numbers from 1 to 400,000, each representing one person killed in Darfur.  Visitors can change the color of a number from gray to white by donating one dollar or more.

One hundred percent of the proceeds from The Darfur Wall benefit four non-profit organizations:
Doctors Without Borders
Save the Children
Sudan Aid Fund / Eric Reeves
Save Darfur Coalition

The Darfur Wall received its first donation on November 15, 2006.  In the next month the project raised more than $10,000 (U.S.). As of March 2009, more than 20% of the wall has been lit, representing donations of over $90,000.

References 
 "Dollar for Darfur helps light up a life and a Web site". Seattle Times. June 15, 2007
 "Young people respond to Darfur crisis". The Republican. January 30, 2007
 "Web creativity brings aid to Darfur". Spokane Spokesman-Review. January 27, 2007
 "Hoping to Help Darfur, $1 at a Time". Seattle Times. January 24, 2007
 "Seattle Man's Darfur Web Site Raises Awareness and Money". Seattle Post-Intelligencer.  January 20, 2007
 "Web Site Shines Light on 400,000 Tragedies" (registration required). Daily Hampshire Gazette. December 29, 2006

External links 
 The Darfur Wall
 The Darfur Foundation

Darfur
American fundraising websites